The 2012 World Club Challenge (also known due to sponsorship as the Heinz Big Soup World Club Challenge) was the thirteenth consecutive World Club Challenge and was contested by Super League XVI champions, Leeds Rhinos and 2011 NRL Premiers, the Manly-Warringah Sea Eagles.

Background

Leeds Rhinos

Leeds had finished the 2011 Super League season in 5th place before making their way to the Grand Final with wins over Hull F.C. (42-10), Huddersfield (34-28) and Warrington (26-24). In the Super League Grand Final, Leeds defeated St. Helens 32–16.

Manly-Warringah Sea Eagles

The Manly-Warringah Sea Eagles finished the 2011 NRL season in 2nd place and went on to defeat the 6th placed New Zealand Warriors 24–10 in the Grand Final. To get to their 3rd Grand Final appearance since 2007, Manly defeated North Queensland 42–8, and the Brisbane Broncos 24–14.

Following the off-season, they lost one trial match against the Cronulla-Sutherland Sharks 6-36 before flying to England for the World Club Challenge. Unlike 2009, Manly would not play a warm up game while in England.

Teams

Match details

The game was highlighted by Ryan Hall's 90-metre intercept try off a Brett Stewart pass midway through the first half to give Leeds a 10–0 lead. Leeds' win in front of a full house at Headingley saw them get revenge for their 28–20 loss to Manly in the 2009 World Club Challenge at Elland Road.

References

External links
 Manly keen to take on Rhinos down under from https://web.archive.org/web/20120618105021/http://www.rleague.com//db/player/h/houston_chris/index.php
 2012 World Club Challenge at maoritelevision.com

World Club Challenge
World Club Challenge
World Club Challenge
Leeds Rhinos matches
Manly Warringah Sea Eagles matches
Sports competitions in Leeds
Rugby league in West Yorkshire